Fort Banks may refer to:
Fort Banks (Australia)
Fort Banks (Massachusetts)